Hugh(e) Hughes (1709–1753)  was Dean of Bangor from 1750 to 1753.

Hughes was born in Llanrwst and educated at Trinity College, Cambridge. He was Precentor of Bangor Cathedral from 1748 his appointment to the deanery.

References

People from Denbighshire
Alumni of Trinity College, Cambridge
18th-century Welsh Anglican priests
1753 deaths
Deans of Bangor
1709 births